Allendale County Airport  is a county-owned public-use airport located  southeast of the central business district of Allendale, a city in Allendale County, South Carolina, United States. The airport serves the general aviation community, with no scheduled commercial airline service.

Facilities and aircraft

For the 12-month period ending 24 October 2018, the airport had 7,020 aircraft operations, an average of 19 per day: 97.6% general aviation, 2.1% air taxi and 0.3% military. At that time there were 10 aircraft based at this airport, all single-engine.

See also
List of airports in South Carolina

References

External links

Airports in South Carolina
Buildings and structures in Allendale County, South Carolina
Transportation in Allendale County, South Carolina